This is a List of National Historic Landmarks in South Carolina, United States.  The United States' National Historic Landmark (NHL) program is operated under the auspices of the National Park Service, and recognizes buildings, sites, structures, districts, and objects according to a list of criteria of national significance. There are 76 NHLs in South Carolina and 3 additional National Park Service-administered areas of primarily historic importance.

Architects whose work is recognized by two or more separate NHLs in the state are:
Robert Mills (8 sites),
Edward Brickell White (4 sites),
Gabriel Manigault (3 sites), and
William Wallace Anderson (2 sites).

These tallies do not include any buildings that are contributing properties within historic districts unless they are also individually designated as NHLs.

There are five places listed for their association with artists and writers.

There are four World War II-era museum ships; all are located at Patriot's Point in Charleston Harbor.

Current NHLs in South Carolina

The 76 NHLs in South Carolina are distributed across 16 of the 46 counties in the state; 42 of the 76 are located in Charleston County.

|}

Historic areas of the National Park System in South Carolina
National Historic Sites, National Historic Parks, National Memorials, and certain other areas listed in the National Park system are historic landmarks of national importance that are highly protected already, often before the inauguration of the NHL program in 1960, and are then often not also named NHLs per se.  There are five of these in South Carolina.  The National Park Service lists these five together with the NHLs in the state,  The Charles Pinckney National Historic Site (also known as Snee Farm) and Ninety Six National Historic Site
are also NHLs and are listed above.  The remaining three are:

Former NHLs in South Carolina

The nuclear-powered commercial vessel NS Savannah was moved to Virginia. Piedmont Number One, a historic textile mill, burned in 1983.

See also
National Register of Historic Places listings in South Carolina
List of National Historic Landmarks by state

References

External links 
.
National Historic Landmarks program, at National Park Service
South Carolina Department of Archives and History: The National Register of Historic Places - Search Records by County
 National Register Information System, National Park Service.

South Carolina
 
South Carolina-related lists
National Historic Landmarks